Kargar Street (Worker Street) is the main street of Amir Abad, and is one of the longest streets of Tehran. It extends from Southern Tehran's Rahahan Square to Northern Amir Abad.

Streets in Tehran